The Northern Cape Department of Co-operative Governance, Human Settlements and Traditional Affairs is one of the departments of the Government of the Northern Cape. It is responsible for the oversight of municipalities and housing developments within the Northern Cape province of South Africa. The political head of the department is the MEC (Member of the Executive Council); as of 2018, this is Bentley Vass.

References

External links
Northern Cape Department: Co-operative Governance, Human Settlements and Traditional Affairs
Northern Cape Department of Co-operative Governance, Human Settlements and Traditional Affairs

Government of the Northern Cape